Srpski Miletić is a village located in the Odžaci municipality, West Bačka District, Vojvodina, Serbia. As of 2011, the village has 3,038 people inhabitants.

Name
In Serbian  the village is known as Srpski Miletić (Српски Милетић), in Croatian as Srpski Miletić, in Hungarian as Rácmilitics, and in German as Berauersheim.

Demographics

According to the last official census done in 2011, the village of Srpski Miletić has 3,038 inhabitants.

See also
 List of places in Serbia
 List of cities, towns and villages in Vojvodina
 Oficijalne novine Novosti Srpski Miletic

References

Slobodan Ćurčić, Broj stanovnika Vojvodine, Novi Sad, 1996.

External links 

 Srpski Miletić

Places in Bačka
West Bačka District
Odžaci